AC/DC are an Australian hard rock band formed in Sydney in 1973 by brothers Angus and Malcolm Young. Although the band are considered pioneers of heavy metal, its members have always classified their music as "rock 'n' roll". AC/DC underwent several line-up changes before releasing their first album, High Voltage, in 1975. Membership remained stable until bassist Cliff Williams replaced Mark Evans in 1977. In 1979, the band recorded their highly successful album Highway to Hell. Lead singer and co-songwriter Bon Scott died on 19 February 1980, after a night of heavy alcohol consumption. The group briefly considered disbanding, but soon ex-Geordie singer Brian Johnson was selected as Scott's replacement. Later that year, the band released their best-selling album, Back in Black. The band's next album, For Those About to Rock We Salute You, was also highly successful and was their first album to reach number one in the United States. AC/DC declined in popularity soon after the departure of drummer Phil Rudd in 1983. Poor record sales continued until the release of The Razors Edge in 1990. Phil Rudd returned in 1994 and contributed to the band's 1995 album Ballbreaker. Stiff Upper Lip was released in 2000 and was well received by critics. The band's new album Black Ice was announced in June 2008 and was released on 20 October 2008. The album's first single, "Rock 'N Roll Train", earned AC/DC a Grammy nomination for Best Rock Group or Duo with Vocals. Another Black Ice track, "War Machine," gained AC/DC their first Grammy Award win, for Best Hard Rock Performance.

From 1982 to 1991, AC/DC have received several nominations from awards ceremonies for their music. The American Music Awards nominated the band for Favorite Pop/Rock Band/Duo/Group. The group received several nominations from the Grammy Awards, including Best Hard Rock/Metal Performance for "Blow Up Your Video" in 1989, and Best Hard Rock Performance for three songs in different years: "The Razors Edge" in 1991, "Moneytalks" in 1992, and "Highway To Hell" in 1994. The band also received the nomination for Best Heavy Metal/Hard Rock Video for "Thunderstruck" in 1991 from the MTV Video Music Awards.

In 2009 AC/DC received four nominations for their 2008 album Black Ice in the ARIA Music Awards which included Best Rock Album, Highest Selling Album, Best Group and Best Album. They won the awards for Best Rock Album and Highest Selling Album. Overall, AC/DC have received thirteen nominations and have won three awards.

AC/DC was nominated for three Grammys for the upcoming 64th Grammy Awards. One for their 2020 album Power Up, Best Rock Album, and two for the 2020 single, "Shot In The Dark", Best Rock Performance and Best Music Video.

Billboard Music Awards

American Music Awards
The American Music Awards is an annual awards ceremony created by Dick Clark in 1973. AC/DC have received one nomination.

|-
|  || AC/DC || Favorite Pop/Rock Band/Duo/Group ||

APRA Awards
The APRA Awards are awarded annually to Australasian artists by the Australasian Performing Right Association.

|-
| 1995 || "Big Gun" –  Angus Young, Malcolm Young || Most Played Australian Work Overseas || 
|-
| 2001 || "It's a Long Way to the Top (If You Wanna Rock 'n' Roll)" –  Bon Scott, Angus Young, Malcolm Young || Ten Best Australian Songs || 
|-
| 2006 || "Highway to Hell" –  Bon Scott, Angus Young, Malcolm Young || Most Played Australian Work Overseas || 
|-
| 2007 || "Highway to Hell" –  Bon Scott, Angus Young, Malcolm Young || Most Played Australian Work Overseas || 
|-
| 2009 || "Highway to Hell" –  Bon Scott, Angus Young, Malcolm Young || Most Played Australian Work Overseas || 
|-
| rowspan="2"| 2010 || "Rock 'n' Roll Train" –  Angus Young, Malcolm Young || Most Played Australian Work Overseas || 
|-
| Angus Young, Malcolm Young || Songwriters of the Year || 
|-
| 2011 || "Highway to Hell" –  Bon Scott, Angus Young, Malcolm Young || Most Played Australian Work Overseas || 
|-
| rowspan="2"| 2015 || "Play Ball"  - Angus Young, Malcolm Young || Song of the Year || 
|-
| "Rock or Bust"  - Angus Young, Malcolm Young || Song of the Year || 
|-
| rowspan="2"| 2022 || "Shot in the Dark" || Most Performed Rock Work || 
|-
| "Realize" - Angus Young, Malcolm Young || Song of the Year ||

ARIA Music Awards

The ARIA Music Awards are awarded annually to Australian artists by the Australian Recording Industry Association since 1987. They were inducted into the Hall of Fame in 1988 alongside their producers Vanda & Young. AC/DC have won four awards from seven nominations.

|-
| 1988 || AC/DC || ARIA Hall of Fame ||  
|-
| rowspan="4"| 2009 || AC/DC || Best Group ||  
|-
| rowspan="3"| Black Ice || Album of the Year ||  
|-
| Best Rock Album ||  
|-
| Highest Selling Album ||  
|-
| 2011 || Live at River Plate || Best Music DVD ||  
|-
| 2015 || Rock or Bust || Best Group || 
|-
| rowspan="2"| 2021 || AC/DC || Best Group ||  
|-
| Power Up || Best Rock Album ||

Classic Rock Roll of Honour Awards

|-
| 2008 || Plug Me In || DVD of the Year  || 
|-
| 2009 || Black Ice || Album of the Year  || 
|-
| 2010 || AC/DC || Band of the Year  || 
|-
| rowspan="2"| 2015 || Rock or Bust || Album of the Year || 
|-
| AC/DC || Band of the Year  ||

Grammy Awards
The Grammy Awards are awarded annually by the National Academy of Recording Arts and Sciences of the United States. AC/DC have won one award from seven nominations.

|-
| 1989 || Blow Up Your Video || Best Hard Rock/Metal Performance || 
|-
| 1991 || The Razors Edge || Best Hard Rock Performance || 
|-
| 1992 || "Moneytalks" || Best Hard Rock Performance || 
|-
| 1994 || "Highway to Hell" || Best Hard Rock Performance || 
|-
| 2009 || "Rock N Roll Train" || Best Rock Performance by a Duo or Group with Vocal || 
|-
|rowspan=2| 2010 || "War Machine" || Best Hard Rock Performance || 
|-
| Black Ice || Best Rock Album || 
|-
| 2013  || Back in Black || Hall of Fame || 
|-
| rowspan="4"| 2022 || Power Up || Best Rock Album ||  
|-
| rowspan="3"| "Shot In The Dark" || Best Rock Song ||  
|-
| Best Music Video ||

Metal Storm Awards

|-
| 2008 || Black Ice || Best Hard Rock Album  || 
|-
| 2014 || Rock of Bust || Best Hard Rock Album || 

MTV Video Music Awards
The MTV Video Music Awards is an annual awards ceremony established in 1984 by MTV. AC/DC have received one nomination.

|-
|  || "Thunderstruck" || Best Heavy Metal/Hard Rock Video || 

Music Victoria Awards
The Music Victoria Awards are an annual awards night celebrating Victorian music. They commenced in 2005.

|-
| 2015 || AC/DC|| Hall of Fame || 
|-

Rock on Request Awards
The Rock on Request Awards are hosted annually by the music webzine Rock on Request. AC/DC have received one award.

|-
| 2008 || AC/DC || Best Reunion || 

UK Music Video Awards

The UK Music Video Awards is an annual award ceremony founded in 2008 to recognise creativity, technical excellence and innovation in music videos and moving images for music. AC/DC has received two awards from two nominations.

|-
| rowspan="2" | 2009
| Black Ice| Best Music AD
| 
|-
| Rocks the Office''
| The Innovation Award
|

References

External links
 AC/DC official website

Awards
Lists of awards received by Australian musician
Lists of awards received by musical group